Damayanthi (1927 – 20 November 2010), better known by her stage name Kozhikode Santha Devi, was an Indian Malayalam film and stage actress. In a career spanning about sixty years, she acted in more than 1000 plays and about 480 films.

Biography 
Santha Devi was born in Kozhikode in a  then well known tharavadu called Thottathil in  1927 as the daughter of Thottathil Kannakkuruppu and Karthiyayani Amma as the seventh daughter of their 10 children. She did her studies from Sabha school and then B.E.M school.

She made her debut as an actress through a 1954 drama Smarakam written by Vasu Pradeep and directed by Kundanari Appu Nair. She made her cinema debut in Minnaminungu (1957) directed by Ramu Karyat. She acted in over 480 movies including Moodupadam, Kuttikkuppayam, Kunjalimaraykkar, Iruttinte Athmavu, Sthalathe pradhana payyans and Adwaitham. Kerala Cafe, produced by director Ranjith, was her last movie where she enacted the role of a forlorn grandmother with no one to look after her. Besides movies, she was also active in television serials. Her most memorable roles are from Manasi and Minnukettu.

Santha Devi died on 20 November 2010 evening in a private hospital in Kozhikode.

Family
She had five brothers and four sisters. All of her brothers were in Air Force and Military services. At the age of 18 she married her uncle's son, Balakrishnan, a railway guard, but the relationship did not last long. He left Santha Devi after the couple had a son. Later, she married Kozhikode Abdul Kader, a popular Malayalam playback singer. She has two sons, Suresh Babu and the late Sathyajith.

Awards and honours 
Santha Devi is a recipient of the Kerala Sangeetha Nataka Akademi Award (1978) and the Kerala Sangeetha Nataka Akademi Fellowship (2003). She won the National Film Award for Best Supporting Actress for her performance in Yamanam (1992) directed by Bharath Gopi. She has received the Kerala State award for best Stage actress in 1968 for her role in Kudukkukal. In 1968, she received award from Thrissur Fine Arts Society and in 1973 she received best actress award again. In 1978, her acting in Ithu bhoomiyanu and Inquilabinte makkal fetched her Kerala Sangeetha Nadaka Acamedy's award for best actress. She won the Kerala Film Critics Association Award in 1979 and Kerala State Award for Best Actress in State plays in 1983 for Deepasthambham Mahashcharyam.

In 1992 she got Film critics award again. Santha Devi was awarded Premji award and later in 2005 the lifetime achievement award from Kerala Sangeetha Nataka Akademi. She won the attimabbe prize also from Karnataka

Filmography (partial)

 Malayalam
 Tharangal (2014) - photo only
 Nurunguvettangal - Short film ... Sr. Margarita
 Kunjipennu (2010) - album
 Uthrada Ravu - Short film
 Annarakkannanum Thannalayathu (2010) ... Valiyathan's mother
 Nalla Pattukare (2010)
 Nandhuni (2010)
 Kerala Cafe (2009)
 Malayali (2009)
 Koodaram (2009)
 Mayabazar(2008)
 Thalappavu (2008)
 Crazy Gopalan (2008) as Janakiyamma
 Vilapagalkkappuram (2008)
 Prajapathi (2006)
  Mamma (2006) - Short film as Mrs. Philipose
 Nottam (2006) as Jankiyamma
 Anandabadram (2005)
 Ullam (2005)
 Maratha Nadu (2004) 
 Akale (2004) as Typewriting teacher
 Freedom (2004)
 Kilichundan Mambhazham (2003) as Maimuna's mother
 Janakeeyam (2003) as Lakshmiyamma
 Anyar (2003) as Ummumma
 Mizhirandilum (2003)
 Ammakkilikkoodu (2003)
 Paadam Onnu: Oru Vilapam (2003)
 Ee Bhargavi Nilayam (2002)
 Neythukaran (2001)
 Kattu Vannu Vilichappol (2001)
 Ninneyum Thedi (2001)
 Rapid Action Force (2000) as Vasanthakumari's muthassi
 Priyankari (2000) 
 Chenaparambile Anakaryam (1998)
 Magician Mahendralal From Delhi (1998)
Oro Viliyum Kathorthu (1998)
Sisiram (1998)
 Irattakuttikalude Achan (1997) as Valsan's mother
 Suvarna Simhaasanam (1997)
 Mahathma (1996)
 Harbour (1996)
 Aakaashathekkoru Kilivaathil (1996)
 Madamma (1996)
 Sundarimare Sookshikkuka (1995)
 No 1 Snehatheeram Bangalore North (1995)
 Chandha (1995)
 Sasinas (1995)
 Oru Abhibashakante Case Diary (1995)
 Sundari Neeyum Sundaran Njanum (1995)
 Mazhayethum Munbe (1995)
 Avan Ananthapadmanabhan (1994)
 Deyvathinte Vikrithikal (1994)
 Tharavadu (1994)
 Pingami (1994)
 Ghazal (1994)
 Bharanakoodam (1994) as Manju's maid
 Chukkan (1994) as Gayathri's Mother 
 Naaraayam (1993)
 Sthalathe Pradhana Payyans (1993)
 Ghoshayathra (1993) as Itheyiumma 
 Agneyam (1993)
 Magrib (1993)
 Yamanam (1992)
 Kamaladalam (1992)
 Dhanam (1991)
 Daivasahayam Lucky Centre (1991)
 Adwaitham (1991)
 Parallel College (1991)
 Aakoshakkottayile Sulthan (1991)
 No 20 Madras Mail (1990)
 Kakkathollayiram (1990)
 Brahmarakshassu (1990)
 Sasneham (1990)
 Aye Auto (1990)
 Carnivel (1989)
 Naduvazhikal (1989)
 Alicinte Anveshanam (1989)
 V. I. P. (1989) as Karthyayani
 Chanakyan(1989)
 Padippura (1989)
 Asthikal Pookkunnu (1989) as Itti
 Kanakambarangal (1988) as Sreedevi's mother
 Dhinarathrangal (1988)
 Oohakachavadam (1988)
 Rithubetham (1987)
 Idanazhiyil Ou Kalocha (1987)
 Nadodikkaattu (1987) as Ramdas's Mother (Cameo appearance)
 PC 369 (1987) as Mandara
 Doore Doore Oru Koodu Koottam (1986)
 Abhayam Thedi (1986)
 Vellam (1985)
 Dheivatheyorthu (1985)
 Anubandham (1985)
 Srikrishna Parundu (1984)
 Maniyara (1983)
 Surumayitta Kannukal (1983)
 Mylanji (1982 )
 Adhikaram (1980)
 Ashwaradham (1980)
 Angadi (1980)
 Chakara (1980) as Subhadra
 Vilkkanundu Swapnangal (1980)
 Neelathamara (1979)
 Thakara (1979)
 Thenthulli (1979)
 Avar Jeevikkunnu (1978)
 Chuvanna Vithukal (1978)
 Padasaram (1978) as Kochukaali
 Aparadhi (1977) as Madhaviyamma
 Yatheem (1977)
 Njavalppazhangal (1976)
 Athithi (1975)
 Utharayanam (1975)
 Nirmala (1975 film) (1975)
 Udayam Kizhakku Thanne (1974)
 Shasthram Jayichu Manushyan Thottu (1973)
 Darshanam (1973)
 Iniyoru Janmam Tharoo (1972)
 Kuttyedathi(1971) as Meenakshi
 Ummachu (1971)
 Velutha Kathreena (1968)
 Thokkukal Kathaparayunnu (1968)
 Anaachadanam (1968)
 Aval (1967)
 Kottayam Kolacase (1967)
 Mulkireedam (1967)
 Iruttinte Athmavu (1967) as Parukkuttiamma
 Ashwamedam (1967) as Lakshmi
 Aneshichu Kandethiyilla (1967)
 Nagarame Nandi (1967)
 Kunjali Marakkar (1967)
 Mayor Nair (1966)
 Murappennu(1965) as Madhaviyamma
 Devalayam (1964)
 Kuttikuppayam (1964)
 Moodupadam (1963)
 Ninamaninja Kalpadukal (1963)
 Minnaminigu(1957)
 Sandehi (1954)
 Hindi
 Triyathri (1990)

Television serials (partial)
Manasi (DD Malayalam)
Pennurimai (DD Malayalam)
Minnukettu (Surya TV)
Manassariyathe (Surya TV)
Kayamkulam Kochunni  (Surya TV)
Ali Manthrikan
Ennapadam
Sakunam ( DD Malayalam)
Vadhu - telefilm
Vidhyarambham - telefilm
Puthiyaplakkuppayam - telefilm
Kannukal- telefilm
Kunchathumma - telefilm

Dramas (partial)
 Kudukkukal
 Smaarakam
 Deepasthambham Mahaascharyam
 Inquilaaabinte Makkal
 Ithu Bhoomiyaannu
 Pediswapnam

References

External links 
 
 Shanthadevi at MSI

Indian film actresses
Actresses from Kozhikode
1927 births
2010 deaths
Best Supporting Actress National Film Award winners
Indian stage actresses
20th-century Indian actresses
21st-century Indian actresses
Actresses in Malayalam cinema
Actresses in Malayalam theatre
Indian television actresses
Actresses in Malayalam television
Recipients of the Kerala Sangeetha Nataka Akademi Fellowship
Recipients of the Kerala Sangeetha Nataka Akademi Award